Conasprella fluviamaris is a species of sea snail, a marine gastropod mollusk in the family Conidae, the cone snails and their allies.

Like all species within the genus Conasprella, these cone snails are predatory and venomous. They are capable of "stinging" humans, therefore live ones should be handled carefully or not at all.

Description
The size of the shell varies between 11 mm and 17 mm.

Distribution
This marine species occurs off Southeast Florida and Dry Tortugas, USA

References

 Petuch E.J. & Sargent D.M. (2011) New species of Conidae and Conilithidae (Gastropoda) from the tropical Americas and Philippines. With notes on some poorly-known Floridian species. Visaya 3(3): 37-58.
  Puillandre N., Duda T.F., Meyer C., Olivera B.M. & Bouchet P. (2015). One, four or 100 genera? A new classification of the cone snails. Journal of Molluscan Studies. 81: 1-23

External links
 To World Register of Marine Species
Cone Shells - Knights of the Sea
 

fluviamaris
Gastropods described in 2011